Coleman is a township municipality in the Canadian province of Ontario. It is situated in the Timiskaming District of Northeastern Ontario. The township had a population of 595 in the Canada 2016 Census.

It is located along Highway 11 and 11-B.

History
The community was first formed around 1906. The township is named after geologist A. P. Coleman, who did extensive work in the region in the late 1800s.  Coleman also mapped the Sudbury Basin, leading to important nickel discoveries, and proved conclusively that the area had been repeatedly glaciated. The township celebrated its first 100 years in 2006.

Demographics 

Mother tongue (2006):
 English as first language: 77.0%
 French as first language: 14.9%
 English and French as first language: 4.6%
 Other as first language: 3.5%

See also
List of townships in Ontario
List of francophone communities in Ontario

References

External links

Municipalities in Timiskaming District
Single-tier municipalities in Ontario
Township municipalities in Ontario